Filippo Lanza (born 3 March 1991) is an Italian professional volleyball player. He was a member of the Italy national team, with which he won a silver medal at the Olympic Games Rio 2016. At the professional club level, he plays for PGE Skra Bełchatów.

Honours
 CEV Champions League
  2015/2016 – with Trentino Volley

 FIVB Club World Championship
  Doha 2012 – with Trentino Volley

 CEV Cup
  2014/2015 – with Trentino Volley
  2016/2017 – with Trentino Volley

 National championships
 2011/2012  Italian SuperCup, with Trentino Volley
 2011/2012  Italian Cup, with Trentino Volley
 2012/2013  Italian Cup, with Trentino Volley
 2012/2013  Italian Championship, with Trentino Volley
 2013/2014  Italian SuperCup, with Trentino Volley
 2014/2015  Italian Championship, with Trentino Volley
 2018/2019  Italian Cup, with Sir Safety Perugia
 2019/2020  Italian SuperCup, with Sir Safety Perugia
 2020/2021  French Championship, with Chaumont VB 52

Individual awards
 2013: FIVB World Grand Champions Cup – Best Outside Spiker

References

External links

 
 
 
 Player profile at LegaVolley.it 
 Player profile at PlusLiga.pl  
 Player profile at Volleybox.net

1991 births
Living people
Sportspeople from the Province of Verona
Italian men's volleyball players
Olympic volleyball players of Italy
Volleyball players at the 2016 Summer Olympics
Medalists at the 2016 Summer Olympics
Olympic silver medalists for Italy
Olympic medalists in volleyball
Mediterranean Games medalists in volleyball
Mediterranean Games gold medalists for Italy
Competitors at the 2013 Mediterranean Games
Italian expatriate sportspeople in France
Expatriate volleyball players in France
Italian expatriate sportspeople in Poland
Expatriate volleyball players in Poland
Trentino Volley players
Skra Bełchatów players
Outside hitters